The  was an electric multiple unit (EMU) train type operated by the private railway operator Tokyu Corporation on the Tokyu Ikegami and Tokyu Tamagawa lines in Japan from 1987 to 2018.

Design
The 7700 series trains were formed between 1987 and 1990 using the bodies of former Tokyu 7000 series trains dating from the 1960s, which were modernized with air-conditioning and mated with new bogies and variable-frequency motor drives.

Operations
The trains were formed as three-car sets and used on the Tokyu Ikegami Line and Tokyu Tamagawa Line.

Formations
The fleet consisted of 15 three-car sets, formed as follows, with two motored ("M") cars and one non-powered trailer ("T") car, and car 1 at the Gotanda/Tamagawa end.

Cars 2 and 3 were each fitted with one lozenge-type pantograph.

Interior
Passenger accommodation consisted of longitudinal seating throughout, with a mixture of brown and orange seat moquette.

History
The 7700 series trains sets were initially formed as two- and four-car sets; however, the fleet was subsequently reformed into three-car sets. Set 7915 was formed in 1996 from three former intermediate cars, and had newly-added cab ends of the same design as the Tokyu 1000 series and Tokyu 9000 series trains. This set was withdrawn in 2010.

Livery variations

Withdrawal and resale

Withdrawals commenced in 2000, with six end cars being resold to the Towada Kankō Electric Railway in Aomori Prefecture. While these three two-car sets retained the "7700 series" classification, they were renumbered 7701+7901 to 7703+7903, irrespective of their original car numbers. The 7700 series sets were completely retired on 24 November 2018.

Preserved examples

The cab end of former car DeHa 7702 is preserved inside the Maruzen Ikebukuro bookshop in Toshima, Tokyo. Built in March 1966 as 7000 series car DeHa 7046, it was withdrawn in December 2015, and moved to the ground floor of the Maruzen Ikebukuro bookshop building in March 2017, while still under construction.

References

External links

 Tokyu EMU details 

Electric multiple units of Japan
7700 series
Train-related introductions in 1987